Labidus is a genus of New World army ants in the subfamily Dorylinae. The genus is known from the United States to Argentina.

Species
Labidus auropubens (Santschi, 1920)
Labidus coecus (Latreille, 1802)
Labidus curvipes (Emery, 1900)
Labidus mars (Forel, 1912)
Labidus praedator (Smith, 1858)
Labidus spininodis (Emery, 1890)
Labidus truncatidens (Santschi, 1920)

References

External links

Dorylinae
Ant genera
Hymenoptera of North America
Hymenoptera of South America